Now Mobile is a mobile virtual network operator service based in the United Kingdom, running on the EE mobile network. It serves ethnic communities.

Award nominations
Now Mobile was commended in the MVNO of the Year category at the 2014 Mobile News Awards.

References

Mobile phone companies of the United Kingdom
Mobile virtual network operators